Bor is a rural locality (a village) in Tolshmenskoye Rural Settlement, Totemsky  District, Vologda Oblast, Russia. The population was 266 as of 2002. There are 4 streets.

Geography 
Bor is located 72 km southwest of Totma (the district's administrative centre) by road. Manylovo is the nearest rural locality.

References 

Rural localities in Totemsky District